Frontier is a Bally pinball machine (produced under the Bally name) released in November 1980. It is based on the mountain man and hunting theme.

Gameplay

Den of Predators and Frontier Bonus

The basic game play is to collect two separate bonuses. The Den of Predators are 5 rows of 3 animals, rolling over lanes A, B and C or hitting the left, center, or right stationary targets lights one animal in the left, center, or right columns respectively. Lighting a complete row of animals advances the "Frontier Bonus". Lighting all the animals advances the "Frontier Bonus" to 60,000 and the "Predator Bonus" to 45,000 and lights "Special".

Grizzly Target
3 in-line drop targets lead the way to the Grizzly Target, increasing the Frontier bonus multiplier. The first drop target also opens the gate to "Frontier Falls".

Right drop targets
The bank of drop target on the right of the pinball machine increase the "Den of Predators" multiplier. They also control targets for "Specials" and awards for "Specials".

Frontier Falls
Frontier Falls is a saucer accessed by first opening a gate activated by hitting the Grizzly Targets. Getting the ball into Frontier Falls collects the current Frontier Bonus.

Playfield features
 2 Flippers
 2 Slingshots
 3 Pop bumpers
 3 Bank drop targets
 3 In-line drop targets
 4 Stationary targets
 Rollunder spinner
 Saucer Kick-out hole

External links
 

1980 pinball machines
Bally pinball machines